Tom Nijssen and Cyril Suk were the defending champions, but competed this year with different partners. Nijssen teamed up with Menno Oosting and lost in the quarterfinals to Petr Korda and Karel Nováček, while Suk teamed up with Hendrik Jan Davids and lost in the semifinals to Boris Becker and Guy Forget.

Becker and Forget won the title by defeating Korda and Nováček 6–2, 6–4 in the final.

Seeds

Draw

Draw

References

External links
 Official results archive (ATP)
 Official results archive (ITF)

Milan Indoor
1995 ATP Tour
Milan